Lokmanya Tilak Terminus (also known by its former name Kurla Terminus, station code: LTT) is a railhead and a major railway terminus in the Kurla suburb of Mumbai, India. LTT is managed by the Central Railway. The  and  suburban railway stations are located nearby.

History
In 1996, the Brihanmumbai Municipal Corporation (BMC) approved a proposal to rename the Kurla Terminus station after Lokmanya Tilak, a popular leader of the Indian independence movement, and forwarded it to the Union Government through the Government of Maharashtra. Then Union Home Minister Lal Krishna Advani approved the proposal in 1999, at the request of Ram Naik, the then Minister of State of Railway. After the decision was announced, Gurudas Kamat, the Lok Sabha member from Mumbai North-East, met L. K. Advani and submitted a memorandum asking that the terminus be renamed after Babasaheb Ambedkar.

In 2003, Central Railway (CR) decided to expand LTT to take on more rail traffic, as the Chhatrapati Shivaji Maharaj Terminus (CSMT) had reached its saturation point, and was unable to handle any more express trains. In 2006, the Mumbai division of CR cleared the designs for the construction of a swanky station complex to replace the dilapidated terminus complex. The new station complex design was prepared by the architect P. K. Das. The Mumbai Metropolitan Region Development Authority (MMRDA) also agreed to construct a ramp from LTT to the flyover to be built nearby, as part of the Santa Cruz–Chembur Link Road (SCLR). The revamped LTT was inaugurated on 16 April 2013 by Railway Minister Pawan Kumar Bansal. The revamp of the terminus took three years. The new station complex was built on 50,000 sq meter land and has a 3,300 sq meter concourse.

In October 2012, CR announced plans to cease long-distance train services at Dadar Terminus within 5–6 years. The load would be transferred to LTT by upgrading the number of platforms at LTT from 5 to 12. CR plans to introduce connectivity with other modes of transport as well as build a mall, multi-story parking, escalators, restaurants, food courts, better signage and indicators, budget hotels and an aesthetically pleasing exterior and interior. The project will be implemented in public–private partnership (PPP) mode and is expected to cost  50–60 billion. The project will be executed by the Railway Land Development Authority on the 20 acres of land that CR possesses around LTT.

Accessibility
LTT is located in the middle of two suburban railway stations, Tilak Nagar and Kurla, on the Harbour line. It is easily accessible through  as a direct overhead bridge is made to LTT from Tilak Nagar. The average opening of the level crossing gate is 20 minutes.

Dormitories
Air-conditioned dormitories were inaugurated at LTT on 16 April 2013 by then Railway Minister Pawan Kumar Bansal. The dorm at LTT is a 24-bed AC dorm exclusively for women.

Rainwater harvesting
Central Railway (CR) completed the installation of a rainwater harvesting system at LTT in October 2012. The system cost  and will conserve 700,000 liters of water, which is approximately 40% of the station's daily water requirement. The rainwater harvesting project will help in the percolation of water into the subsoil, which will reduce flooding in the vicinity during the monsoon. The project involved constructing a 2 km trench and filling it with crushed stones.

References

External links

Departures from Lokmanya Tilak Terminus

Railway stations in Mumbai Suburban district
Railway terminus in India

Memorials to Bal Gangadhar Tilak
Railway stations opened in 1991
Indian Railway A1 Category Stations
1991 establishments in Maharashtra